Turlough Herbert (born 1968 in Castleconnell, County Limerick, Ireland) is an Irish retired sportsperson.  He played hurling with his local club Ahane and was a member of the Limerick senior inter-county team from 1993 until 1996.

References

1968 births
Living people
Ahane hurlers
Limerick inter-county hurlers